Munya  is a Local Government Area in Niger State, Nigeria. Its headquarters are in the town of Sarkin Pawa in the north of the area near Kaduna State at.

It has an area of 2,176 km and a population of 103,651 at the 2006 census.

The postal code of the area is 921.

It is located in the eastern region of the state. Its main inhabitants are the Gwari people with farming as their main occupation.

Guni
Munya is made up of eight political wards with Guni ward as the largest and strongest of all. Guni as its popularly called, is the back bone of the whole state at large with most of the missionary schools in the state capital were relocated from Guni. in the local government level, Guni is the town with the most elite people to include the Magaji's family which over the years have contributed to the development and creation of the local government and partly the state at large.

2021 raid 
On 17 November 2021, a gang of 80 armed bandits raided a village in Munya, killing 2 people and kidnapping 66 more, including the two wives of a local politician, and the mayor's two children. The attack was part of a broader campaign by bandits in the region.

References

Local Government Areas in Niger State